Ghulam Faruq is a Muslim male given name. It may refer to:

Ghulam Faruque Khan (1899–1992), Pakistani economist, bureaucrat, politician and industrialist
Ghulam Faruq Yaqubi (born 1938), Afghan politician and Army General
Dr. Syed Gulam Farooq Mirranay (born 1950), Member of the Afghan National Parliament
Ghulam Faroq Nijrabi (born 1954), medical doctor who stood for President of Afghanistan in 2009
Ghulam Farooq Wardak (born 1959), Afghan Minister of Education
Ghulam Farooq Awan (born 1961), Pakistani lawyer and politician
Golam Faruq (cricketer), Bangladeshi cricket player
Ghulam Farooq (detainee), Afghan held in Bagram

Arabic masculine given names